Microtubule associated scaffold protein 2 is a protein that in humans is encoded by the MTUS2 gene.

References

Further reading